Taeniopteryx is a genus of winter stoneflies in the family Taeniopterygidae. There are more than 20 described species in Taeniopteryx.

Species
These 23 species belong to the genus Taeniopteryx:

 Taeniopteryx araneoides Klapálek, 1902
 Taeniopteryx auberti Kis & Sowa, 1964
 Taeniopteryx burksi Ricker & Ross, 1968 (eastern willowfly)
 Taeniopteryx caucasica Zhiltzova, 1981
 Taeniopteryx fusca Ikonomov, 1980
 Taeniopteryx hubaulti Aubert, 1946
 Taeniopteryx kuehtreiberi Aubert, 1950
 Taeniopteryx lita Frison, 1942
 Taeniopteryx lonicera Ricker & Ross, 1968
 Taeniopteryx maura (Pictet, 1841)
 Taeniopteryx mercuryi Fochetti & Nicolai, 1996
 Taeniopteryx metequi Ricker & Ross, 1968
 Taeniopteryx nebulosa (Linnaeus, 1758)
 Taeniopteryx nelsoni Kondratieff & Kirchner, 1982
 Taeniopteryx nivalis (Fitch, 1847) (boreal willowfly)
 Taeniopteryx parvula Banks, 1918 (hooked willowfly)
 Taeniopteryx robinae Kondratieff & Kirchner, 1984
 Taeniopteryx schoenemundi (Mertens, 1923)
 Taeniopteryx stankovitchi Ikonomov, 1978
 Taeniopteryx starki Stewart & Szczytko, 1974
 Taeniopteryx ugola Ricker & Ross, 1968
 † Taeniopteryx ciliata (Pictet, 1856)
 † Taeniopteryx elongata (Hagen, 1856)

References

Further reading

External links

 

Taeniopterygidae